Pacific Bible College is a private Bible college in Medford, Oregon.

History 
In 1989 local Christian radio station owner, Perry Atkinson met with a group of pastors to discuss the possibility of a Bible college in southern Oregon. In December 1991 Dove Bible Institute was founded. The name was changed to Pacific Bible College in 2000.

Academics

Accreditation 
Pacific Bible College is accredited by the Commission on Accreditation of the Association of Biblical Higher Education and authorized by the State of Oregon.

References

External links 

 

Seminaries and theological colleges in Oregon
Education in Medford, Oregon
Bible colleges
Educational institutions established in 1991
1991 establishments in Oregon